Jacques Wallage (born 27 September 1946) is a retired Dutch politician of the Labour Party (PvdA) and sociologist.

Wallage attended a Gymnasium in Groningen from April 1959 until May 1965 and applied at the University of Groningen in June 1965 majoring in Political sociology and Urban planning and obtaining a Bachelor of Social Science degree in Political sociology in June 1967 and worked as a student researcher before graduating with a Master of Social Science degree in Political sociology in July 1971. Wallage served on the Municipal Council of Groningen from April 1970 until June 1981 and served as an Alderman in Groningen from May 1972 until June 1981. Wallage also was active as a political activist and was one of the student leaders of the New Left movement which aimed to steer the Labour Party more to Progressivism.

Wallage was elected as a Member of the House of Representatives after the election of 1982, taking office on 10 June 1981 serving as a frontbencher chairing the parliamentary committee for Science Policy and spokesperson for Education, Social Work, Equality, Minorities and deputy spokesperson for Welfare and Culture. After the election of 1989 Wallage was appointed as State Secretary for Education and Sciences in the Cabinet Lubbers III, taking office on 7 November 1989. Wallage was appointed as State Secretary for Social Affairs and Employment following the resignation of Elske ter Veld, taking office on 9 June 1993. After the election of 1994 Wallage returned as a Member of the House of Representatives, taking office on 17 May 1994. Following the cabinet formation of 1994 the Leader of the Labour Party and the Parliamentary leader of the Labour Party in the House of Representatives Wim Kok became Prime Minister in the Cabinet Kok I, the Labour Party leadership approached Wallage as his successor as Parliamentary leader, Wallage accepted and became the Parliamentary leader, taking office on 22 August 1994. As Parliamentary leader of the largest party in the House of Representatives he also chaired the parliamentary committee for Intelligence and Security. After the election of 1998 Wim Kok returned as Parliamentary leader on 19 May 1998 but following the cabinet formation of 1998 he remained as Prime Minister in the Cabinet Kok II and the Labour Party leadership approached Wallage as interim Parliamentary leader, taking office on 30 May 1998 until Ad Melkert was approached as Parliamentary leader on 10 July 1998 and he continued to serve in the House of Representatives as a frontbencher and the de facto Whip.

In August 1998 Wallage was nominated as Mayor of Groningen, he resigned as Member of the House of Representatives on 26 August 1998 and was installed as Mayor of Groningen, serving from 1 October 1998 until 25 June 2009. Wallage semi-retired from national politics and became active in the private sector and public sector and occupied numerous seats as a corporate director and nonprofit director on several boards of directors and supervisory boards (PostNL, International Institute of Social History, Groninger Museum, International Cycling Film Festival, Radio Netherlands Worldwide, Royal Association of Shipowners and the Maritime Research Institute) and served on several state commissions and councils on behalf of the government (Accreditation Council, Kadaster and Public Pension Funds APB). Wallage also served as a distinguished professor of Governmental Studies, Public administration and Social integration at the University of Groningen from 1 September 2009 until 1 October 2014 and a distinguished visiting professor of Public administration at the University of Groningen since 1 October 2014.

Decorations

- honorary citizen of Groningen

References

External links

Official
  Prof.Drs. J. (Jacques) Wallage Parlement & Politiek

1946 births
Living people
Aldermen of Groningen
Commanders of the Order of Orange-Nassau
Dutch academic administrators
Dutch corporate directors
Dutch nonprofit directors
Dutch political commentators
Dutch public administration scholars
Dutch sociologists
Dutch Jews
Governmental studies academics
Jewish Dutch politicians
Jewish educators
Jewish mayors of places in the Netherlands
Jewish sociologists
Knights of the Order of the Netherlands Lion
Labour Party (Netherlands) politicians
Mayors of Groningen
Members of the House of Representatives (Netherlands)
Municipal councillors of Groningen (city)
People from Apeldoorn
Politicians from Haarlem
Political sociologists
State Secretaries for Education of the Netherlands
State Secretaries for Social Affairs of the Netherlands
University of Groningen alumni
Academic staff of the University of Groningen
20th-century Dutch educators
20th-century Dutch politicians
21st-century Dutch businesspeople
21st-century Dutch educators
21st-century Dutch politicians